Giglio Gregorio Giraldi (Lilius Gregorius Gyraldus or Giraldus) (14 June 1479 – February 1552) was an Italian scholar and poet.

He was born at Ferrara, where he early distinguished himself by his talents and acquirements.
On the completion of his literary course, he removed to Naples, where he lived on familiar terms with Jovianus Pontanus and Sannazaro; and subsequently to Lombardy, where he enjoyed the favour of the Mirandola family. At Milan in 1507 he studied Greek under Chalcondylas; and shortly afterwards, at Modena, he became tutor to Ercole (afterwards Cardinal) Rangone.

About the year 1514, he removed to Rome, where, under Clement VII, he held the office of apostolic protonotary; but having in the sack of that city (1527), which almost coincided with the death of his patron Cardinal Rangone, lost all his property, he returned in poverty once more to Mirandola, whence again he was driven by the troubles consequent on the assassination of the reigning prince in 1533.

The rest of his life was one long struggle with ill-health, poverty and neglect; and he is alluded to with sorrowful regret by Montaigne in one of his Essais (i.35), as having, like Sebastian Castalio, ended his days in utter destitution. He died at Ferrara in February 1552, and his epitaph makes touching and graceful allusion to the sadness of his end.

Giraldi was a man of very extensive erudition, and numerous testimonies to his profundity and accuracy have been given both by contemporary and by later scholars. His Historia de deis gentium (1548) marked a distinctly forward step in the systematic study of classical mythology; and by his treatises De annis et mensibus, and on the Calendarium Romanum et Graecum, he contributed to bring about the reform of the calendar, which was ultimately effected by Pope Gregory XIII.

His Progymnasma adversus literas et literatos deserves mention at least among the curiosities of literature, and among his other works to which reference is still occasionally made are Historiae poëtarum Graecorum ac Latinorum; De poëtis suorum temporum; and De sepultura ac vario sepeliendi ritu. Giraldi was also an elegant Latin poet.

His Opera omnia was published at Leiden in 1696.

Works

References

1479 births
1552 deaths
Italian poets
Italian male poets
Writers from Ferrara